Yang Gao is the Professor of Space Autonomous Systems and the Associate Dean (International) in the Faculty of Engineering and Physical Sciences (FEPS) at Surrey Space Centre. Gao's work has been used for developing missions including ExoMars, Proba3, MoonLITE and Moonraker.

Early life and education 
Gao received a B. Eng (with first class honors) in Electrical and Electronic Engineering at Nanyang Technological University, Singapore in 2000, followed by a Ph.D. in Electrical and Electronic Engineering from the same university in 2003.

Career 
Gao develops robotics for extreme environments, specializing in robotic perception and sensing and applications of artificial intelligence. Gao's work has been covered in numerous media outlets, including the BBC.

Gao is an elected fellow of the Royal Aeronautical Society and the Institute of Engineering and Technology.

Awards and honors 

 Institute of Engineering and Technology (IET) - Elected Fellow
 Royal Aeronautical Society (RAeS) - Elected Fellow.
 SCEPTrE Fellowship - 2010-2011
 SMF Fellowship - 2002-2004
 NTU Scholarship for PhD Research - 2000-2002
 Singapore-Millennium-Foundation Fellowship - 2002
 First Prize, IEEE Asia-Pacific Region Postgraduate Paper Contest - 2002
 Motorola Book Prize on Robotics and Automation - 2000

References

External links
Yang Gao, faculty profile at the University of Surrey

Living people
Academics of the University of Surrey
Aeronautical engineers
Fellows of the Royal Aeronautical Society
Fellows of the Institute of Engineering and Technology
Year of birth missing (living people)